Zhima Jie (芝麻街) is the Chinese co-production of Sesame Street. The show was produced from 1998 to 2001, for a total run of 130 half-hour episodes. It was filmed in Shanghai and aired on Shanghai Television.

History 
Before the co-production, Sesame Street's 12th season had been dubbed into Mandarin in 1981 and distributed through China Central Television.

1998 version 
Pre-production on the show was headed in part by a team of eighteen Chinese child education specialists, led by Xie Xide. Some of the Shanghai Television producers also traveled to New York to meet and work with Sesame Workshop staff. Kevin Clash ran the auditions and training for the production's puppeteers.

Unlike other international co-productions, Zhima Jie would have its own version of Big Bird, Da Niao, rather than a new full-body mascot unique to their iteration. This was due to Big Bird's already existing popularity in China. Caroll Spinney, who originated the character on the American production, had final say on who would play the character.

General Electric sponsored the show from 1998 to 2001. There was an unsuccessful attempt to revive it for the 2004 season.

2010 version 
As with the 1998 version, the 2010 version filmed original segments in Shanghai.

It returned in December 2010 as Zhima Jie: Da Niao Kan Shijie (芝麻街: 大鸟看世界, Sesame Street: Big Bird Looks at the World). It has aired on CCTV Children's Channel, Guangdong Jiajia, and on Toonmax Channel.

The program focused on teaching basic skills, such as literacy, numeracy, and an appreciation of the arts, and was funded in part by the Merck Foundation.

Characters

1998 
 Xiao Mei Zi (小梅子), Little Plum, a red Elmo-like monster who is 3 years old and enjoys reading books and listening to stories. 
 Hu Hu Zhu (呼呼猪), Puffing Pig, is a furry blue pig who is similar to Cookie Monster. He loves arts, especially opera.
 Da Niao (大鸟), Big Bird's identical cousin, who lives at a park in a nest and enjoys eating bird seed cookies.
 Played by Zhu Ming and dubbed by LaLa Ma

2010 
 Tiger Lily, a tiger cub.
 Elmo, a furry red monster from Sesame Street
 Old Lady Wang, owner of a noodle shop and practitioner of t'ai chi ch'uan

Messaging 
Like other international co-productions, Zhima Jie covered the four broad curriculum categories of Child's World (understanding the self), Family and Society, Symbolic Representation (reading and numeracy) and Cognitive Organization (classification and perception). However, the production also added a fifth category of Aesthetics and Arts, which included coverage of Chinese calligraphy, experiencing nature, dance, and music composition.

The 1998 production had compassion as one of the primary themes for the first season. It also included segments showing cultural diversity within China and reminding children that failure is okay. The show also had bumpers lasting thirty seconds which aimed to teach specific scientific concepts, like relative buoyancy of different objects.

The 2010 production focused on science education and emergency preparedness. Having episodes focus primarily on science allowed creators to explore a topic with more depth than would be possible in a shorter segment. Episodes started with characters posing a question, followed by an explanation using examples or videos, and ending with children in the studio performing related activities on their own.

Episodes 
The 2010 production totaled 52 11-minute episodes.

Books
 Sesame Street School Readiness (11 titles)
 Sesame Street Thinking Child (6 titles)
 Sesame Street Learning Environment (4 titles)

In other media 
Starting in 2014, the characters in Sesame Street and Zhima Jie guest starred on the Bai Nian La (拜年啦) on every Chinese New Years (January 31, 2014 - February 5, 2019). These six years are the Year of the Horse, the Goat, the Monkey, the Rooster, the Dog, and the Pig.

References

External links 

1998 Chinese television series debuts
1990s Chinese television series
2001 Chinese television series endings
2010 Chinese television series debuts
Chinese children's television series
Chinese television shows featuring puppetry
Sesame Street international co-productions